Take it Easy was an Australian television variety series which aired from 1959 to 1960 on Melbourne station GTV-9. Hosted by Bob Horsfall and Joy Fountain, the series aired at 1:00pm on Tuesdays, and included guests, contests and quizzes. 

It represented an early attempt at midday programming by a Melbourne station, as television in the city was not yet a 24-hour service. Little else is known about the series.

References

External links
Take it Easy at IMDb

Nine Network original programming
1959 Australian television series debuts
1960 Australian television series endings
Black-and-white Australian television shows
English-language television shows
Australian variety television shows